{{Speciesbox
| image = Black-crested_Titmouse.jpg
| status = LC
| status_system = IUCN3.1
| status_ref = 
| genus = Baeolophus
| species = atricristatus
| authority = Cassin, 1850
| subdivision_ranks = Subspecies
| subdivision =
 B. a. atricristatus
 B. a. paloduro
 B. a. sennetti
| range_map = Baeolophus atricristatus distribution map.png
| range_map_caption = Range of 'Baeolophus atricristatus}}

The black-crested titmouse or Mexican titmouse (Baeolophus atricristatus), is a passerine bird in the tit family Paridae. Once considered a subspecies of the tufted titmouse (B. bicolor), it was recognized as a separate species in 2002. It is native to southern Texas, Oklahoma, and east-central Mexico. Vagrants have been seen as far north and east as St. Louis, Missouri.

The male has a long, dark black crest that is usually erect, while the female's crest is not as dark. It is common wherever trees grow, whether they are deciduous, heavy timber, or urban shade trees. Its call peter, peter, peter'' is similar to that of the tufted titmouse, but shorter. Its diet consists of berries, nuts, spiders, insects, and insect eggs.

The black-crested titmouse nests in tree cavities, telephone poles, fence posts, and bird boxes. The eggs, four to seven of which are laid in March or April, are white with reddish-brown spots.

References

External links

Black-crested titmouse photos

black-crested titmouse
Birds of the Rio Grande valleys
Birds of Mexico
black-crested titmouse
black-crested titmouse